The South African Railways Class MC 2-6-6-0 of 1912 was a steam locomotive.

In 1912, the South African Railways placed ten Class MC Mallet articulated compound steam locomotives with a 2-6-6-0 wheel arrangement in service in Natal.

Manufacturer
To augment the Mallet locomotive fleet operating across the more difficult sections of the Natal mainline, the South African Railways (SAR) placed an order with the North British Locomotive Company for ten compound steam locomotives which were very similar to the Class MB. They were delivered and placed in service in May 1912, designated Class MC and numbered in the range from 1607 to 1616.

Compounding
In a compound locomotive, steam is expanded in phases. After being expanded in a high-pressure cylinder and having then lost pressure and given up part of its heat, it is exhausted into a larger-volume low-pressure cylinder for secondary expansion, after which it is exhausted through the smokebox.

In the compound Mallet locomotive, the rear set of coupled wheels are driven by the smaller high-pressure cylinders, which are fed steam from the steam dome. Their spent steam is then fed to the larger low-pressure cylinders which drive the front set of coupled wheels. By comparison, in the more usual arrangement of simple expansion steam is expanded just once in any one cylinder before being exhausted through the smokebox.

Characteristics
Like the previous Mallets, these ten compound locomotives had Walschaerts valve gear and used saturated steam. The high-pressure cylinders of the hind engine unit were equipped with piston valves while the low-pressure cylinders of the front engine unit were equipped with slide valves.

The locomotives differed little from the previous Mallets in size, power and performance and may for all intents and purposes also have been classified as Class MB. It would seem that, compared to the Cape Government Railways which tended to group locomotives in the same Class which were dissimilar even to the extent of having different wheel arrangements, the early SAR at times took locomotive classification to the other extreme.

Unlike the Class MB on which the sandboxes were placed on top of the boiler in accordance with American practice, the sandboxes of the Class MC were arranged on a different system, the advantages of which were questionable. The sandboxes for the hind engine unit were secured to the running board just to the rear of the high-pressure cylinders, while those for the front engine unit were placed on the upper sides of the boiler just to the rear of the smokebox.

Superheating
The Class MC were satisfactory locomotives but like the earlier Mallet compounds, they would have performed better if they had been superheated. No others were modified in this manner.

Service
The Class MC joined the Class MA and MB fleet on the Natal mainline, working heavy coal trains between Estcourt and Highlands. In later years, some were transferred to the Cape Western System where they served into the 1930s as banking locomotives up the Hex River Railpass between De Doorns and Touws River. Others were transferred to the Witwatersrand for general service and to haul coal on the Witbank-Germiston line. They were withdrawn from service during 1933.

References

2220
2-6-6-0 locomotives
(1C)C locomotives
NBL locomotives
Cape gauge railway locomotives
Railway locomotives introduced in 1912
1912 in South Africa
Scrapped locomotives